Danny Post (born 7 April 1989) is a Dutch professional footballer who plays as a midfielder for Almere City.

Career
Born in Amsterdam, Post has played for Haarlem, FC Groningen, SC Cambuur, FC Dordrecht and VVV-Venlo.

On 29 January 2022, Post signed a contract with Almere City until June 2024.

References

External links
 

1989 births
Living people
Dutch footballers
Association football midfielders
HFC Haarlem players
FC Groningen players
SC Cambuur players
FC Dordrecht players
VVV-Venlo players
Almere City FC players
Eredivisie players
Eerste Divisie players
Footballers from Amsterdam